Utik (also known as Uti, Utiq, or Outi) was a historic province of the Kingdom of Armenia. It was ceded to Caucasian Albania following the partition of Armenia between Sassanid Persia and the Eastern Roman Empire in 387 AD. Most of the region is located within present-day Azerbaijan immediately west of the Kura River, while a part of it lies within the Tavush province of present-day northeastern Armenia.

History
According to Strabo, in the 2nd century BC, Armenians conquered from the Medes the lands of Syunik and Caspiane, and the lands that lay between them, including Utik, that was populated by the people called Utis, after whom it received its name. Modern historians agree that "Utis" were a people of non-Armenian origin, and the modern ethnic group of Udi is their descendants. According Robert Hewsen, the mountainous part of Utik (according to the administrative boundaries of Greater Armenia), Gardman and Tavush was a homeland of proto-Armenian tribes. According to classical sources, Armenians settled as far as the Kura River in about the 7th century BC. After the conquest of Armenia in the 4th or 2nd century BC Utik still had also Armenian population. The province was called Otena in Latin sources and Otene in Greek sources.

According to the Armenian geographer Anania Shirakatsi's Ashkharatsuyts ("Geography", 7th century), Utik was the 12th among the 15 provinces of the Kingdom of Armenia, and belonged, at the time, to the Caucasian Albania (when the Utik and Artsakh provinces were lost by Armenia after its partition in the 4th century). According to Ashkharatsuyts, Utik consisted of 8 cantons (gavars, in Armenian): Aranrot, Tri, Rotparsyan, Aghve, Tuskstak (Tavush), Gardman, Shakashen, and Uti. The province was bounded by the Kura River from north-east, river Arax from south-east, and by the province of Artsakh from the west.

Greco-Roman historians from the 2nd century BC to the 4th century AD state that Utik was a province of Armenia, with the Kura River separating Armenia and Albania. But the Armenian-Albanian boundary along the Kura River, confirmed by Greco-Roman sources, was often overrun by armies of both countries.

According to Strabo, Armenia, which in the 6th century BC had covered a large portion of Asia, had lost some of its lands by the 2nd century BC. At the same time Strabo wrote: "According to report, Armenia, though a small country in earlier times, was enlarged by Artaxias and Zariadris". Around 190 BC, under the king Artashes I, Armenia conquered Vaspurakan and Paytakaran from Media, Acilisene from Cataonia, and Taron from Syria. Some have suggested that Utik was among the provinces conquered by Artashes I at this time, though Strabo doesn't list Utik among Artashes' conquests.

King Urnayr of Caucasian Albania invaded Utik. But in 370 AD, the Armenian sparapet Mushegh Mamikonyan defeated the Albanians, restoring the frontier back to the river Kura. In 387 AD, the Sassanid Empire helped the Albanians to seize from the Kingdom of Armenia a number of provinces, including Utik.

In the middle of the 5th century, by the order of the Persian king Peroz I, the king Vache of Caucasian Albania built in Utik the city initially called Perozapat, and later Partaw and Barda, and made it the capital of Caucasian Albania.

Starting with the 13th century, the area covered by Utik and Artsakh was called Karabakh by non-Armenians.

Population
In ancient times, the area was inhabited by Armenians and "Utis" (likely the ancestors of modern day Udi people), after whom it was named. The early Armenian historian Movses Khorenatsi wrote that the local princes of Utik descended from the Armenian noble family of Sisakan and spoke Armenian.

Utik had been one of the provinces of Greater Armenia, the population of which is referred to by the name Udini (or Utidorsi) in Latin sources, and by the name Outioi in Greek sources. However, Ancient Greco-Roman writers placed the Udis beyond Utik, north of the Kura River.

Pliny the Elder names both the Uti and the Udini among the tribes living in eastern Transcaucasia and calls the latter a Scythian tribe ("Scytharum populus"). This suggests the possibility that some Iranian-speaking or, less likely, Finnic peoples may have settled in the area and adopted the language of the local Caucasian population). More likely, however, the terms refer not to any specific ethnic group in the modern sense but simply the inhabitants of the eponymous region.

See also
List of regions of old Armenia

References

Provinces of the Kingdom of Armenia (antiquity)
Ancient history of Azerbaijan